Plaid Cymru (officially Plaid Cymru – the Party of Wales, and often referred to simply as Plaid) is a centre-left to left-wing, Welsh nationalist political party in Wales, committed to Welsh independence from the United Kingdom.

Plaid was formed in 1925 and won its first seat in the UK Parliament in 1966. The party holds four of 40 Welsh seats in the UK Parliament, 13 of 60 seats in the Senedd, and 202 of 1,231 principal local authority councillors. It is a member of the European Free Alliance.

Platform

Plaid Cymru's goals as set out in its constitution are:
 To promote the constitutional advancement of Wales with a view to attaining independence;
 To ensure economic prosperity, social justice and the health of the natural environment, based on decentralist socialism;
 To build a national community based on equal citizenship, respect for different traditions and cultures and the equal worth of all individuals, whatever their race, nationality, gender, colour, creed, sexuality, age, ability or social background;
 To create a bilingual society by promoting use of the Welsh language;
 To promote Wales' contribution to the global community and to attain membership of the United Nations.

In September 2008, a senior Plaid assembly member spelled out her party's continuing support for an independent Wales. Then Welsh Minister for Rural Affairs, Elin Jones, told delegates at Plaid's annual conference in Aberystwyth that the party would continue its commitment to independence under the coalition with Welsh Labour.

While Wales remains a member of the United Kingdom, Plaid Cymru want to see further powers devolved from the UK Government to Wales, including: broadcasting and communication powers, devolution of the Crown Estate, welfare and rail.

The party opposes nuclear power and nuclear weapons (including the UK's Trident nuclear weapons programme). 

The party also favours lowering the voting age to 16 years old. The voting age has already been lowered to include 16 and 17-year-olds for both Senedd elections and local elections in Wales since 2020, but not for UK general elections or police and crime commissioner elections where the minimum voting age for both is 18-years-old.

Plaid Cymru supports making social care "free at the point of need".

History

Beginnings

Initially, home rule for Wales was not an explicit aim of the new movement; keeping Wales Welsh-speaking took primacy, with the aim of making Welsh the only official language of Wales.

In the 1929 general election the party contested its first parliamentary constituency, Caernarvonshire, polling 609 votes, or 1.6% of the vote for that seat. The party contested few such elections in its early years, partly due to its ambivalence towards Westminster politics. Indeed, the candidate Lewis Valentine, the party's first president, offered himself in Caernarvonshire on a platform of demonstrating Welsh people's rejection of English dominion.

1930s
By 1932, the aims of self-government and Welsh representation at the League of Nations had been added to that of preserving Welsh language and culture. However, this move, and the party's early attempts to develop an economic critique, did not broaden its appeal beyond that of an intellectual and socially conservative Welsh language pressure group. The alleged sympathy of the party's leading members (including President Saunders Lewis) towards Europe's totalitarian regimes compromised its early appeal further.

Saunders Lewis, David John Williams and Lewis Valentine set fire to the newly constructed RAF Penyberth air base on the Llŷn Peninsula in Gwynedd in 1936, in protest at its siting in the Welsh-speaking heartland. The leaders' treatment, including the trial judge's dismissal of the use of Welsh and their subsequent imprisonment in Wormwood Scrubs, led to "The Three" becoming a cause célèbre. This heightened the profile of the party dramatically and its membership had doubled to nearly 2,000 by 1939.

1940s

Penyberth, and Plaid Cymru's neutral stance during the Second World War, prompted concerns within the UK Government that it might be used by Germany to insert spies or carry out other covert operations. In fact, the party adopted a neutral standpoint and urged (with only limited success) conscientious objection to war service.

In 1943 Saunders Lewis contested the University of Wales parliamentary seat at a by-election, gaining 1,330 votes, or 22%. In the 1945 general election, with party membership at around 2,500, Plaid Cymru contested seven seats, as many as it had in the preceding 20 years, including constituencies in south Wales for the first time. At this time Gwynfor Evans was elected president.

1950s

Gwynfor Evans's presidency coincided with the maturation of Plaid Cymru (as it now began to refer to itself) into a more recognisable political party. Its share of the vote increased from 0.7% in the 1951 general election to 3.1% in 1955 and 5.2% in 1959. In the 1959 election, the party contested a majority of Welsh seats for the first time. Proposals to flood the village of Capel Celyn in the Tryweryn valley in Gwynedd in 1957 to supply the city of Liverpool with water played a part in Plaid Cymru's growth. The fact that the parliamentary bill authorising the dam went through without support from any Welsh MPs showed that the MPs' votes in Westminster were not enough to prevent such bills from passing.

1960s
Support for the party declined slightly in the early 1960s, particularly as support for the Liberal Party began to stabilise from its long-term decline. In 1962 Saunders Lewis gave a radio talk entitled Tynged yr Iaith (The fate of the language) in which he predicted the extinction of the Welsh language unless action was taken. This led to the formation of Cymdeithas yr Iaith Gymraeg (the Welsh Language Society) the same year.

Labour's return to power in 1964 and the creation of the post of Secretary of State for Wales appeared to represent a continuation of the incremental evolution of a distinctive Welsh polity, following the Conservative government's appointment of a Minister of Welsh Affairs in the mid-1950s and the establishment of Cardiff as Wales' capital in 1955.

However, in 1966, less than four months after coming in third in the constituency of Carmarthen, Gwynfor Evans captured the seat from Labour at a by-election. This was followed by two further by-elections in Rhondda West in 1967 and Caerphilly in 1968 in which the party achieved massive swings of 30% and 40% respectively, coming within a whisker of victory. The results were caused partly by an anti-Labour backlash. Expectations in coal mining communities that the Wilson government would halt the long-term decline in their industry had been dashed by a significant downward revision of coal production estimates. However, particularly in Carmarthen, Plaid also successfully depicted Labour's policies as a threat to the viability of small Welsh communities.

1970s
In the 1970 general election Plaid Cymru contested every seat in Wales for the first time and its vote share surged from 4.5% in 1966 to 11.5%. Gwynfor Evans lost Carmarthen to Labour, but regained the seat in October 1974, by which time the party had gained a further two MPs, representing the constituencies of Caernarfon and Merionethshire.

Plaid campaigned to leave the Common Market in the 1975 referendum. Wales and the United Kingdom as a whole voted to remain.

Plaid Cymru's emergence (along with the Scottish National Party) prompted the Wilson government to establish the Kilbrandon Commission on the constitution. The subsequent proposals for a Welsh Assembly were, however, heavily defeated in a referendum in 1979. Despite Plaid Cymru's ambivalence toward home rule (as opposed to outright independence) the referendum result led many in the party to question its direction.

In 1975, Plaid Cymru opposed remaining in the European Communities (EC), feeling that the EC’s regional aid policies would "reconcile places like Wales to their subordinate position". Nevertheless, 65% of Welsh voters voted to remain in the EC during a 1975 referendum. The EC were incorporated into the European Union (EU) in 1993.

At the 1979 general election the party's vote share declined from 10.8% to 8.1% and Carmarthen was again lost to Labour, although Caernarfon and Merionethshire were held by the party.

1980s
Caernarfon MP Dafydd Wigley succeeded Gwynfor Evans as president in 1981, inheriting a party whose morale was at an all-time low. In 1981 the party adopted "community socialism" as a constitutional aim. While the party embarked on a wide-ranging review of its priorities and goals, Gwynfor Evans fought a successful campaign (including the threat of a hunger strike) to oblige the Conservative government to fulfill its promise to establish S4C, a Welsh-language television station. In 1984 Dafydd Elis-Thomas was elected president, defeating Dafydd Iwan, a move that saw the party shift to the left. Ieuan Wyn Jones (later Plaid Cymru leader) captured Ynys Môn from the Conservatives in 1987. In 1989 Dafydd Wigley once again assumed the presidency of the party.

1990s
In the 1992 general election the party added a fourth MP, Cynog Dafis, when he gained Ceredigion and Pembroke North from the Liberal Democrats. Dafis was endorsed by the local branch of the Green Party. The party's vote share recovered to 9.9% at the 1997 general election.

In 1997, following the election of a Labour government committed to devolution for Wales, a further referendum was narrowly won, establishing the National Assembly for Wales. Plaid Cymru became the main opposition to the ruling Labour Party, with 17 seats to Labour's 28. In doing so, it appeared to have broken out of its rural Welsh-speaking heartland, and gained seats in traditionally strong Labour areas in industrial South Wales.

Assembly/Senedd era

First National Assembly (1999–2003)
In the 1999 election Plaid Cymru gained seats in traditional Labour areas such as Rhondda, Islwyn and Llanelli, achieving by far its highest share of the vote in any Wales-wide election. While Plaid Cymru regarded itself as the natural beneficiary of devolution, others attributed its performance in large part to the travails of the Labour Party, whose nomination for Assembly First Secretary, Ron Davies, was forced to stand down in an alleged sex scandal. The ensuing leadership battle, won by Alun Michael, did much to damage Labour, and thus aided Plaid Cymru, whose leader was the more popular and higher profile Dafydd Wigley. The Labour Party's UK national leadership was seen to interfere in the contest and deny the popular Rhodri Morgan victory. Less than two months later, in elections to the European parliament, Labour support slumped further, and Plaid Cymru came within 2.5% of achieving the largest share of the vote in Wales. Under the new system of proportional representation, the party also gained two MEPs.

Plaid Cymru then developed political problems of its own. Dafydd Wigley resigned, citing health problems but amid rumours of a plot against him. His successor, Ieuan Wyn Jones, struggled to impose his authority, particularly over controversial remarks made by a councillor, Seimon Glyn. At the same time, Labour leader and First Minister Alun Michael was replaced by Rhodri Morgan.

In the 2001 general election, notwithstanding Plaid Cymru recording its highest-ever vote share in a general election, 14.3%, the party lost Wyn Jones's former seat of Ynys Môn to Albert Owen, although it gained Carmarthen East and Dinefwr, where Adam Price was elected.

Second National Assembly (2003–07)
The Assembly elections of May 2003 saw the party's representation drop from 17 to 12, with the seats gained in the 1999 election falling again to Labour and the party's share of the vote declining to 21%. Plaid Cymru narrowly remained the second-largest party in the National Assembly ahead of the Conservatives, Liberal Democrats and Forward Wales.

On 15 September 2003 folk-singer and county councillor Dafydd Iwan was elected as Plaid Cymru's president. Ieuan Wyn Jones, who had resigned from his dual role as president and Assembly group leader following the losses in the 2003 Assembly election, was re-elected in the latter role. Elfyn Llwyd remained the Plaid Cymru leader in the Westminster Parliament. Under Iwan's presidency the party formally adopted a policy of independence for Wales within Europe.

The 2004 local election saw the party lose control of the two South Wales councils it gained in 1999, Rhondda Cynon Taff and Caerphilly, while retaining its stronghold of Gwynedd in the north-west. The results enabled the party to claim a greater number of ethnic minority councillors than all the other political parties in Wales combined, along with gains in authorities such as Cardiff and Swansea, where Plaid Cymru representation had been minimal. In the European Parliament elections of the same year, the party's vote share fell to 17.4%, and the reduction in the number of Welsh MEPs saw its representation reduced to one.

In the general election of 5 May 2005, Plaid Cymru lost the Ceredigion seat to the Liberal Democrats; this result was a disappointment to Plaid, who had hoped to gain Ynys Môn. Overall therefore, Plaid Cymru's Parliamentary representation fell to three seats, the lowest number for the party since 1992. The party's share of the vote fell to 12.6%.

Since Plaid Genedlaethol Cymru reformation to 'Plaid Cymru' in 1933, the logo representing the party was the green 'triban' (three peaks) which symbolically represented Plaid's three key goals; self-government, cultural prosperity and economic prosperity, 'anchored in the bedrock of Welsh identity and history that is the Welsh upland landscape', the logo would change in the late stages of 20th century to include the red dragon of Wales, however this version was short-lived. In 2006, the party voted constitutional changes to formally designate the party's leader in the assembly as its overall leader, with Ieuan Wyn Jones being restored to the full leadership and Dafydd Iwan becoming head of the voluntary wing of the party. 2006 saw the party unveil a radical change of image, opting to use "Plaid" as the party's name, although "Plaid Cymru — the Party of Wales" would remain the official title. Plaid would abandon the triban (apart from the merchandise) and adopt the yellow Welsh poppy (Meconopsis cambrica).

Third National Assembly (2007–2011)
In the National Assembly election of 3 May 2007, Plaid Cymru increased its number of seats from 12 to 15, regaining Llanelli, gaining one additional list seat and winning the newly created constituency of Aberconwy. The 2007 election also saw Plaid Cymru's Mohammad Asghar become the first ethnic minority candidate elected to the Welsh Assembly. The party's share of the vote increased to 22.4%.

After weeks of negotiations involving all four parties in the Assembly, Plaid Cymru and Labour agreed to form a coalition government. Their agreed "One Wales" programme included a commitment for both parties to campaign for a Yes vote in a referendum on full law-making powers for the Assembly, to be held at a time of the Welsh Assembly Government's choosing. Ieuan Wyn Jones was subsequently confirmed as Deputy First Minister of Wales and Minister for the Economy and Transport. Rhodri Glyn Thomas was appointed Heritage Minister. He later stood down, and Alun Ffred Jones took over. Ceredigion AM Elin Jones was appointed to the Rural Affairs brief in the new 10-member cabinet. Jocelyn Davies became Deputy Minister for Housing, and later, Regeneration.

In the 2010 general election, Plaid returned three MPs to Westminster. They took part in the Yes for Wales cross-party campaign for the March 2011 referendum.

Fourth National Assembly (2011–16)
In the 2011 National Assembly election Plaid slipped from second place to third, being overtaken by the Welsh Conservatives and losing its deputy leader Helen Mary Jones. The party held an inquiry into the election result. The internal investigation led to the adoption of wide-ranging changes to its constitution, including a streamlining of the leadership structure.

In May 2011, Ieuan Wyn Jones announced he would stand down as leader within the first half of the Assembly term. A leadership election was held in which three candidates eventually stood: Elin Jones, Dafydd Elis-Thomas and Leanne Wood; Simon Thomas withdrew his candidacy before ballots were cast.

On 15 March 2012, Plaid Cymru elected Leanne Wood as its new leader. She received 55% of the vote, over second-placed Elin Jones with 41%. Wood was the party's first female leader, and its first not to be a fluent Welsh speaker. Soon after her election as leader she appointed former MP Adam Price to head an economic commission for the party "focussed on bringing together tailor-made policies in order to transform our economy". On 1 May 2012, it was confirmed Leanne Wood would not be taking the £23,000 pay increase that every other party leader in the Assembly receives.

On 12 November 2012, Wood announced she would aim to abandon her relatively safe list seat by winning a constituency at the 2016 National Assembly elections; she later confirmed she would contest the Rhondda. Adam Price was subsequently selected as the party's candidate for Carmarthen East and Dinefwr. Lindsay Whittle confirmed he would stand solely in Caerphilly.

On 20 June 2013, former party leader Ieuan Wyn Jones stood down from the Assembly as the member for Ynys Môn. Plaid Cymru's candidate Rhun ap Iorwerth was elected as the new Assembly Member for the constituency, receiving 12,601 votes (a 58% share) with a majority of 9,166 over the Labour candidate.

Fifth National Assembly/Senedd (2016–2021)
At the 2016 Welsh Assembly elections, Plaid Cymru gained one seat, became the Assembly's second-largest party and briefly became the official opposition to the Welsh Government with 12 seats. By January 2018 Plaid Cymru had been reduced to ten Assembly Members, following the resignation of Dafydd Elis-Thomas in 2016 and the permanent expulsion of Neil McEvoy from Plaid's Assembly group in 2018.

Despite campaigning to leave in 1975, Plaid campaigned for a Remain vote in the 2016 referendum on the UK's membership of the EU, spending £27,495 on the campaign. In the referendum Wales voted 52.5% in favour of Leave. Immediately after the referendum, Leanne Wood stated that voters 'must be respected' and criticised calls for a second EU referendum. Plaid Cymru later modified their policy to support a People's Vote.

In the 2017 United Kingdom general election, Plaid saw their popular vote fall, but narrowly gained Ceredigion and saw Arfon become highly marginal.

In September 2018, Adam Price won the party's leadership election, defeating the incumbent Leanne Wood and fellow challenger Rhun ap Iorwerth.

In the Brecon and Radnorshire by-election Plaid Cymru decided not to put up a candidate, but instead to support the Liberal Democrat candidate Jane Dodds in order to maximise the chance of an anti-Brexit candidate winning.

In the 2019 United Kingdom general election, Plaid stood aside in four seats to endorse Unite to Remain candidates. Plaid held their four seats but saw a decrease in their popular vote.

Sixth Senedd (2021–)
In the run-up to the 2021 Senedd election, polling suggested that Welsh Labour would win the highest number of seats but fall short of an overall majority. Pollsters and commentators suggested that the most likely outcome would be another Labour–Plaid Cymru coalition, an option First Minister Mark Drakeford said he would be open to. Price insisted that his party would not be Labour's "junior partner", nor would they work with the Conservatives under any circumstances. He stated that Plaid would be willing to join forces with Labour, but only if the former were the largest party or if it were an equal partnership. Price also said that he did not consider Welsh independence to be "a distraction or a constitutional abstraction", but rather "a practical necessity".

At the election, Plaid increased their seat total to thirteen, up one from the twelve they won in 2016, but lost out in their target constituencies, and lost Rhondda where former leader Leanne Wood lost her seat to Labour. Price said he would not resign, telling ITV Wales: "My job is to lead, its not to give up at a set back or disappointment. My job is to sustain the hope – all those young people who voted for Plaid because they were inspired by our message of the potential we believe is there in Wales to deliver a decent society for our people. I firmly believe that we have sown a lot of seed at this election. A lot of young people in particular who did come with us this time has laid the foundations for the future which I think will set us up for growth in the years to come."

On 22 November 2021, despite Price's earlier comments about refusing to work with Labour, the two parties announced a co-operation agreement consisting of almost 50 different policies, including providing free school meals for all primary school children, the establishment of a free-at-point-of-need national care system and building a railway between North and South Wales. Price called the agreement "a down-payment on independence" and claimed that the results of the Senedd election "confirmed Wales's status as an indy-curious nation. A curiosity that will give birth – sooner than many think – to an independent Wales." He went on to say, "For Wales to be free, we must first be united. And, that is what this Co-operation Agreement sets out to achieve. It launches us on a pathway to a united Wales, one that, sooner than we perhaps think, will find it both comfortable and natural, indeed essential, to join the world community of normal, independent nations."

The co-operation agreement was ratified by Plaid's conference, with 94% voting in favour. "This is a huge step forward for Wales and our democracy,” Price said. "The co-operation agreement will bring immediate, tangible and long-term benefit for the people of Wales. All primary school children will now receive free school meals; there will be free childcare for all two-year-olds; and radical action to tackle the housing crisis. There will be stability payments to support family farms; exploration of an accelerated pathway to net zero by 2035; the creation of Ynni Cymru – a company to expand community-owned renewable energy generation; and a new and reformed Senedd – bigger, more diverse, and gender balanced in law. From feeding our children to caring for our elderly, this is a nation-building Programme for Government which will change the lives of thousands of people the length and breadth of our country for the better. And none of it would be happening without Plaid Cymru."

Independence Commission 2020 
Before the 2019 general election, Price announced that he would set up a commission to look at the practicality of Welsh independence, and how a Plaid Government would hold an independence referendum. The commission, led by former Dwyfor Meirionydd Plaid MP Elfyn Llwyd, released its report on 25 September 2020. It recommends five key aims for Plaid Cymru:

 Says an independent Wales should seek membership of the European Union, with a possible intermediate step being membership of the European Free Trade Area.
 Recommends that Wales explores a confederal relationship with England and Scotland.
 Proposes improvements to the operation of the Welsh Government and civil service.
 Points the way to drawing up a Welsh Constitution and sets out a framework for a Self-Determination Bill to take the independence process forward.
 A statutory National Commission should provide the people of Wales with a clear understanding of the option for their political future – including through Citizens' Assemblies and an initial referendum to test a range of constitutional options.

It also recommends that there should be one multiple choice referendum to gauge views and to persuade a UK Westminster government to agree to a referendum on the preferred option.

The report was met with criticism from the Welsh Liberal Democrats, describing the report as a mix of "fanatical politics" and "pie in the sky economics".

In December 2020, Price stated that an independence referendum would be held in Plaid Cymru's first term in office, if the party won a majority at the 2021 Senedd election.

Undeb Credyd Plaid Cymru 
Undeb Credyd Plaid Cymru Credit Union Limited is a savings and loans co-operative established for party members in 1986. Based in Roath, Cardiff, it is a member of the Association of British Credit Unions Limited. The credit union is authorised by the Prudential Regulation Authority and regulated by the Financial Conduct Authority and the PRA. Ultimately, like the banks and building societies, members’ savings are protected against business failure by the Financial Services Compensation Scheme.

Party leadership

Leaders
The Party leader was referred to as the president until March 2000 when the separate role of Leader was created.

Deputy leaders

Chief executives

Elected representatives

House of Commons

Senedd
Llyr Huws Gruffydd, MS for North Wales electoral region
Siân Gwenllian, MS for Arfon
Rhun ap Iorwerth, MS for Ynys Môn
Luke Fletcher, MS for South Wales West electoral region
Cefin Campbell, MS for Mid and West Wales electoral region
Elin Jones, MS for Ceredigion
Delyth Jewell, MS for South Wales East electoral region
Sioned Williams, MS for South Wales West electoral region
Adam Price, MS for Carmarthen East and Dinefwr
Mabon ap Gwynfor, MS for Dwyfor Merionnydd
Peredur Owen Griffiths, MS for South Wales East

Heledd Fychan, MS for South Wales Central

Local councillors
202 councillors in local government. They form the Plaid Cymru Councillors Association.

Appointments

House of Lords

Electoral performance

House of Commons

*Six seats (Blaenau Gwent, Ceredigion & Pembroke North, Islwyn, Monmouth, Newport West and Torfaen) contested on a joint Plaid Cymru/Green Party ticket

National Assembly/Senedd

Local councils

*The 2012 figures exclude Anglesey, where the vote was delayed until 2013. The changes in seats and votes shown for 2012 are a direct comparison since the 2008 elections in the 21 councils up for election (i.e. excluding Anglesey).

In 2008 Plaid won 205 seats including six in Anglesey. For the purposes of this table the 205 figure has been reduced to 199 for the 2012 elections where the party lost 41 of the 199 seats it was defending on the night, leaving them with 158 seats.

In the 2013 elections in Anglesey the party won 12 seats, up from the 6 it won in 2008 (although there were significant boundary changes and a reduction in the total number of seats from 40 to 30).

The 2017 figures are based on changes from the 2012 and 2013 elections. (Hence the slight discrepancy in the percentage increase.)

Police and Crime Commissioners

European Parliament

European Free Alliance

Plaid retains close links with the Scottish National Party (SNP), with both parties' MPs co-operating closely with one another. They work as a single parliamentary group within Westminster, and were involved in joint campaigning, under the banner of a "Celtic alliance", during the 2001 and 2010 general elections. Both Plaid and the SNP, along with Mebyon Kernow of Cornwall, are members of the European Free Alliance (EFA), a pan-European political party for regionalist, autonomist and pro-independence political parties across Europe. The EFA co-operates with the larger European Green Party to form The Greens–European Free Alliance (Greens/EFA) political group in the European Parliament, although the UK is no longer a member of the European Union.

See also

List of Plaid Cymru MSs
List of Plaid Cymru MPs
Credit unions in the United Kingdom
Culture of Wales
Politics of Wales
Republicanism in the United Kingdom

References

External links

 
1925 establishments in Wales
Anti-austerity political parties in the United Kingdom
Centre-left parties in the United Kingdom
Civic nationalism
Credit unions of the United Kingdom
Democratic socialist parties in Europe
Devolution in the United Kingdom
European Free Alliance
Left-wing nationalist parties
Political parties established in 1925
Social democratic parties in the United Kingdom
Socialist parties in Wales
Welsh nationalist parties